Chiesanuova may refer to:

 Chiesanuova, a minor municipality of San Marino
 Chiesanuova, Piedmont, a comune in the Metropolitan City of Turin in the Italian region Piedmont, 
 Chiesanuova, populated place in Sannicola, Italy
 Chiesanuova, populated place in Brescia, Italy
 Chiesanuova, populated place in San Donà di Piave, Italy
 Chiesanuova, populated place Chiesina Uzzanese, Italy
 Chiesanuova, populated place in  Valderice, Italy
 Chiesanuova, populated place in Treia, Italy

See also 

 Chiesa Nuova (disambiguation)